Sachiko Kodama (born ) is a retired Japanese female volleyball player, playing as an outside hitter. She was part of the Japan women's national volleyball team.

She participated in the 2002 FIVB Volleyball Women's World Championship.
She won the bronze medal at the 2002 Asian Games. On club level she played for Toray Arrows in 2002.

References

1978 births
Living people
Japanese women's volleyball players
Volleyball players at the 2002 Asian Games
Place of birth missing (living people)
Asian Games medalists in volleyball
Asian Games bronze medalists for Japan
Medalists at the 2002 Asian Games